Spheciospongia is a genus of sponges belonging to the family Clionaidae.

The species of this genus are found in Southern Hemisphere.

Species:

Spheciospongia albida 
Spheciospongia alcyonoides 
Spheciospongia areolata 
Spheciospongia australis 
Spheciospongia capensis 
Spheciospongia carnosa 
Spheciospongia confoederata 
Spheciospongia congenera 
Spheciospongia digitata 
Spheciospongia excentrica 
Spheciospongia florida 
Spheciospongia globularis 
Spheciospongia inconstans 
Spheciospongia incrustans 
Spheciospongia lacunosa 
Spheciospongia massa 
Spheciospongia mastoidea 
Spheciospongia montiformis 
Spheciospongia ndabazithe 
Spheciospongia panis 
Spheciospongia papillosa 
Spheciospongia peleia 
Spheciospongia poculoides 
Spheciospongia potamophera 
Spheciospongia poterionides 
Spheciospongia purpurea 
Spheciospongia ramulosa 
Spheciospongia robusta 
Spheciospongia rotunda 
Spheciospongia ruetzleri 
Spheciospongia semilunaris 
Spheciospongia solida 
Spheciospongia spiculifera 
Spheciospongia symbiotica 
Spheciospongia tentorioides 
Spheciospongia transitoria 
Spheciospongia vagabunda 
Spheciospongia vesparium

References

Sponges